Richard Lumley, 1st Earl of Scarbrough (1650 – 17 December 1721), was an English soldier and statesman best known for his role in the Glorious Revolution.

Origins
Lumley was the son of John Lumley and Mary Compton, and the grandson of Richard Lumley, 1st Viscount Lumley, and Frances Shelley. The Lumleys were an ancient family from the north of England. Richard became the 2nd Viscount Lumley (in the Irish peerage) on his grandfather's death in 1661/1662, his father having died in 1658. He was brought up as a Roman Catholic and was taken on the Grand Tour by Catholic priest, Richard Lassels, but had turned Protestant by the time of his introduction into the House of Lords on 19 May 1685.

Early career
Lumley attended the Duke of York on his way to Scotland in November 1679 and was a volunteer in the abortive expedition to Tangier in 1680. In the latter year, he was appointed Master of the Horse to Catherine of Braganza, whose Treasurer he later became in 1684. He was created Baron Lumley by Charles II on 31 May 1681. He played a prominent part in the suppression of the rebellion of the Duke of Monmouth, having been personally responsible (according to John Evelyn) at the head of the Sussex Militia for Monmouth's arrest, unarmed and bearded in a dry ditch covered with fern brakes. From 1685 to 1687, he was Colonel of the Queen Dowager's or 9th Regiment of Horse.

Career following the Glorious Revolution
Lumley was one of the Immortal Seven, the English noblemen who invited William of Orange to invade England and depose his father-in-law, James II. He secured Newcastle for William in December 1688.  After William became King, he appointed Lumley in rapid succession in 1689/90 as a Gentleman of the Bedchamber, a member of the Privy Council, Colonel of the 1st Troop of Horse Guards (until 1699), Viscount Lumley of Lumley Castle, Lord Lieutenant of Northumberland and Lord Lieutenant of Durham. Lumley was created Earl of Scarbrough on 15 April 1690.

Scarbrough took part in the Battle of the Boyne in 1690 and was afterwards in Flanders. He was appointed major-general in May 1692 and lieutenant-general on 4 October 1694, retiring from active service after the Treaty of Ryswick in 1697 (though he received a new commission as lieutenant-general of all the forces on 9 March 1701/2).  He was Chancellor of the Duchy of Lancaster from 1716 to 1717. After his elevation, he significantly extended his family seat at Lumley Castle. He died of apoplexy in Gerard Street, Soho, on 17 December 1721.

Family
Lumley was married to Frances Jones (1665–1722), daughter of Sir Henry Jones of Oxfordshire. The Countess served as a Lady of the Bedchamber at the court of Queen Anne.  

He and his wife had children:

Henry Lumley, Viscount Lumley, (died 1710)
Richard Lumley, 2nd Earl of Scarbrough, (1688 – 29 January 1739)
Mary, (14 December 1690 – 12 December 1726), who married George Montague, 1st Earl of Halifax
William, (died 9 April 1709)
Thomas Lumley, 3rd Earl of Scarborough, (1691 – 15 March 1752)
Charles Lumley (c.1693–1728)
Ann (died 28 February 1740)
John Lumley (c.1703–1739)   
James Lumley (c.1706–1766)

See also
List of deserters from James II to William of Orange

References

|-

|-

|-

|-

|-

|-

British Life Guards officers
Carabiniers (6th Dragoon Guards) officers
Sussex Militia officers
Chancellors of the Duchy of Lancaster
Lord-Lieutenants of Durham
Lord-Lieutenants of Northumberland
1650 births
1721 deaths
Earls of Scarbrough
Peers of England created by Charles II
People of the Glorious Revolution
Barons Lumley